Roman Chlouba (born February 11, 1991) is a Czech professional ice hockey player. He currently plays with LHK Jestřábi Prostějov of the Czech 1. Liga.

Chlouba made his Czech Extraliga debut playing with Piráti Chomutov debut during the 2012–13 Czech Extraliga season.

References

External links

1991 births
Living people
Czech ice hockey forwards
Sportspeople from Chomutov
Piráti Chomutov players
HC Slavia Praha players
Sportovní Klub Kadaň players